Liolaemus galactostictos is a species of lizard in the family  Liolaemidae. It is native to Argentina.

References

galactostictos
Reptiles described in 2021
Taxa named by Luciano Javier Ávila
Taxa named by Jack W. Sites Jr.
Taxa named by Mariana Morando
Reptiles of Argentina